This is a list of places in Israel which have standing links to local communities in other countries known as "town twinning" (usually in Europe) or "sister cities" (usually in the rest of the world).

A
Acre

 Bielsko-Biała, Poland
 Bregenz, Austria
 Nagykanizsa, Hungary
 Pisa, Italy
 Recklinghausen, Germany
 La Rochelle, France
 Trakai, Lithuania
 Warren, United States
 Youngstown, United States

Ashdod

 Arkhangelsk, Russia
 Atyrau, Kazakhstan
 Bahía Blanca, Argentina
 Bahir Dar, Ethiopia
 Batumi, Georgia
 Bordeaux, France
 Brest, Belarus
 Iași, Romania
 Spandau (Berlin), Germany
 Tampa, United States
 Wuhan, China
 Zaporizhia, Ukraine

Ashkelon

 Aix-en-Provence, France
 Baltimore, United States
 Côte Saint-Luc, Canada
 Entebbe, Uganda
 Grodno, Belarus
 Iquique, Chile
 Kutaisi, Georgia
 Marmaris, Turkey
 Pankow (Berlin), Germany
 Portland, United States
 Sacramento, United States
 Sopot, Poland
 Uman, Ukraine
 Vadodara, India

B
Bat Yam

 Antalya, Turkey
 Aurich (district), Germany
 Kostroma, Russia
 Kragujevac, Serbia
 Kutno, Poland
 Livorno, Italy
 Neukölln (Berlin), Germany
 Valparaíso, Chile
 Villeurbanne, France
 Vinnytsia, Ukraine

Beersheba

 Adana, Turkey
 Addis Ababa, Ethiopia
 Cluj-Napoca, Romania
 Lyon, France
 Munich, Germany
 Niš, Serbia
 Oni, Georgia
 Parramatta, Australia
 La Plata, Argentina

 Seattle, United States
 Winnipeg, Canada
 Wuppertal, Germany

Beit Shemesh

 Cocoa, United States
 Hangzhou, China
 Lancaster, United States
 Nordhausen, Germany

 Ramapo, United States
 Split, Croatia

Bnei Brak

 Brooklyn (New York), United States
 Lakewood, United States

D
Drom HaSharon

 Emmendingen (district), Germany
 Neuwied, Germany

E
Eilat

 Acapulco, Mexico
 Antibes, France
 Arica, Chile

 Kamen, Germany
 Kampen, Netherlands
 Karlovy Vary, Czech Republic
 Los Angeles, United States
 Palanga, Lithuania
 Piešťany, Slovakia

 Sopron, Hungary
 Sorrento, Italy
 Yalta, Ukraine
 Yinchuan, China

G
Gan Yavne
 Puteaux, France

Gedera

 Roman, Romania
 Valence, France

Giv'at Shmuel

 Dubna, Russia
 Gołdap, Poland
 Stade, Germany

Givatayim

 Arad, Romania
 Chattanooga, United States
 Esslingen (district), Germany
 Harbin, China
 Mulhouse, France
 Ohrid, North Macedonia
 Oradea, Romania
 Sfântu Gheorghe, Romania
 Vác, Hungary

H
Hadera

 Besançon, France
 Big Spring, United States

 Derbent, Russia
 El Paso, United States
 Nuremberg, Germany
 Rizhao, China

 Tomar, Portugal

Haifa

 Aalborg, Denmark
 Antwerp, Belgium
 Bremen, Germany
 Cape Town, South Africa
 Chengdu, China
 Düsseldorf, Germany
 Erfurt, Germany
 Fort Lauderdale, United States
 Hackney, England, United Kingdom
 Limassol, Cyprus
 Mainz, Germany
 Manila, Philippines
 Mannheim, Germany
 Marseille, France
 Newcastle upon Tyne, England, United Kingdom
 Odesa, Ukraine
 Portsmouth, England, United Kingdom
 Rosario, Argentina
 San Francisco, United States
 Shanghai, China
 Shantou, China
 Shenzhen, China

Herzliya

 Alicante, Spain
 Banská Bystrica, Slovakia
 Beverly Hills, United States
 Columbus, United States
 Dnipro, Ukraine
 Funchal, Portugal
 Hollywood, United States
 Leipzig, Germany
 Marl, Germany
 Paphos, Cyprus
 San Bernardino, United States
 San Isidro, Argentina

Hevel Modi'in
 Ammerthal, Germany

Hod HaSharon
 Dorsten, Germany

Holon

 Andong, South Korea
 Anshan, China
 Cleveland, United States
 Dayton, United States
 Hann. Münden, Germany
 Mitte (Berlin), Germany
 Suresnes, France

J
Jerusalem

 Ayabe, Japan
 Cusco, Peru
 Jersey City, United States
 New York City, United States
 Niterói, Brazil
 Rio de Janeiro, Brazil
 Salvador, Brazil

K
Kadima-Zoran

 Allauch, France
 Frankfurt an der Oder, Germany

Karmiel

 Berat, Albania
 Câmpulung Moldovenesc, Romania
 Charlottenburg-Wilmersdorf (Berlin), Germany
 Denver, United States
 Hamar, Norway
 Kisvárda, Hungary
 Mangalia, Romania
 Metz, France
 Pittsburgh, United States

Kfar Saba

 Delft, Netherlands
 Gainesville, United States
 Jinan, China
 Mülheim an der Ruhr, Germany
 San José, Costa Rica
 Wiesbaden, Germany

Kiryat Bialik

 Hlybokaye, Belarus
 Ismayilli, Azerbaijan
 Radomsko, Poland
 Rosh HaAyin, Israel
 Steglitz-Zehlendorf (Berlin), Germany
 Zakynthos, Greece
 Zestaponi, Georgia

Kiryat Ekron

 Akron, United States
 Bussy-Saint-Georges, France

Kiryat Motzkin

 Bad Kreuznach (district), Germany
 Bad Segeberg, Germany

 Haßberge (district), Germany
 Kaifeng, China
 Mariánské Lázně, Czech Republic
 Nyíregyháza, Hungary
 Orlando, United States
 Radzyń Podlaski County, Poland
 Włodawa County, Poland

Kiryat Ono

 Dormagen, Germany
 Offenbach (district), Germany
 Smallingerland, Netherlands

Kiryat Yam

 Créteil, France
 Friedrichshain-Kreuzberg (Berlin), Germany
 Makó, Hungary
 Poti, Georgia
 Sighetu Marmației, Romania

L
Lod

 Gori, Georgia
 Kraljevo, Serbia
 Piatra Neamț, Romania

M
Ma'alot-Tarshiha

 Asti, Italy
 Birobidzhan, Russia
 Harrisburg, United States
 Perpignan, France
 Reichenbach im Vogtland, Germany

Mateh Asher

 Oldenburg, Germany
 West Des Moines, United States

Mateh Yehuda

 Luján de Cuyo, Argentina
 Nümbrecht, Germany
 Vantaa, Finland
 Würzburg (district), Germany

Misgav
 Pittsburgh, United States

Modi'in-Maccabim-Re'ut

 Banja Luka, Bosnia and Herzegovina
 Hagen, Germany
 Haikou, China

N
Nahariya

 Bielefeld, Germany
 Issy-les-Moulineaux, France
 Kecskemét, Hungary
 Lefkada, Greece
 Liberec, Czech Republic
 Miami Beach, United States
 Stupino, Russia
 Tempelhof-Schöneberg (Berlin), Germany

Nazareth

 Baguio, Philippines
 Częstochowa, Poland
 Florence, Italy
 Nablus, Palestine
 Neubrandenburg, Germany

Ness Ziona

 Freiberg, Germany
 Le Grand-Quevilly, France
 Piotrków Trybunalski, Poland
 Qingdao, China
 Solingen, Germany

Netanya

 Batumi, Georgia
 Bournemouth, England, United Kingdom
 Como, Italy
 Dortmund, Germany
 Gelendzhik, Russia
 Giessen, Germany
 Gold Coast, Australia
 Nice, France
 Nowy Sącz, Poland
 Poděbrady, Czech Republic
 Richmond Hill, Canada
 Sarcelles, France
 Siófok, Hungary
 Stavanger, Norway
 Sunny Isles Beach, United States

Nof HaGalil

 Alba Iulia, Romania
 Birobidzhan, Russia
 Chernivtsi, Ukraine
 Győr, Hungary
 Kikinda, Serbia
 Klagenfurt, Austria
 Leverkusen, Germany
 Saint-Étienne, France
 San Miguel de Tucumán, Argentina
 Uman, Ukraine

O
Or Akiva

 Le Castellet, France
 Dmitrovsky District, Russia
 Hîncești, Moldova

P
Pardes Hanna-Karkur
 Grasse, France

Pardesiya
 Viersen, Germany

Petah Tikva

 Bacău, Romania
 Cherkasy, Ukraine
 Chernihiv, Ukraine
 Chicago, United States
 Las Condes, Chile
 Gabrovo, Bulgaria
 Gyumri, Armenia
 Kadıköy, Turkey
 Koblenz, Germany
 Międzyrzec Podlaski, Poland
 Șimleu Silvaniei, Romania
 Taichung, Taiwan
 Trondheim, Norway
 Yiyang, China

R
Ra'anana

 Atlanta, United States
 Boulogne-Billancourt, France
 Bramsche, Germany
 Goslar, Germany
 Opsterland, Netherlands
 Poznań, Poland
 Rio de Janeiro, Brazil
 Tainan, Taiwan

Ramat Gan

 Barnet, England, United Kingdom
 Kassel, Germany
 Main-Kinzig (district), Germany
 Penza, Russia
 Phoenix, United States
 Qingdao, China
 Rio de Janeiro, Brazil
 San Borja, Peru
 Shenyang, China
 Strasbourg, France
 Szombathely, Hungary
 Taoyuan, Taiwan
 Weinheim, Germany
 Wrocław, Poland

Ramat HaSharon

 Dunkirk, France
 Georgsmarienhütte, Germany
 Saint-Maur-des-Fossés, France
 Tallahassee, United States

Ramla

 Daugavpils, Latvia
 Kansas City, United States
 Kielce, Poland
 Kuçovë, Albania
 Mekelle, Ethiopia
 Moers, Germany
 Panevėžys, Lithuania

 Vaughan, Canada
 Vyborg, Russia

Rehovot

 Albuquerque, United States
 Bistrița, Romania
 Grenoble, France
 Heidelberg, Germany
 Paraná, Argentina
 Rochester, United States
 Valjevo, Serbia

Rishon LeZion

 Admiralteysky (Saint Petersburg), Russia
 Brașov, Romania
 Debrecen, Hungary
 Gondar, Ethiopia
 Kaunas, Lithuania
 Kharkiv, Ukraine
 Lublin, Poland
 Münster, Germany
 Nîmes, France
 Prešov, Slovakia
 Teramo, Italy

Rosh HaAyin

 Birmingham, United States
 Kiryat Bialik, Israel
 Prague 1 (Prague), Czech Republic
 Vanves, France

S
Sderot

 Antony, France
 Fryazino, Russia
 Steglitz-Zehlendorf (Berlin), Germany

T
Tel Aviv

 Almaty, Kazakhstan
 Beijing, China
 Bonn, Germany
 Budapest, Hungary
 Buenos Aires, Argentina
 Chişinău, Moldova
 Cologne, Germany
 Essen, Germany
 Frankfurt am Main, Germany
 Freiburg im Breisgau, Germany
 Incheon, South Korea
 İzmir, Turkey
 Łódź, Poland
 Milan, Italy
 Philadelphia, United States
 Sofia, Bulgaria
 Thessaloniki, Greece
 Toulouse, France
 Warsaw, Poland

Tel Mond
 Sarasota, United States

Tiberias

 Allentown, United States
 Great Neck Plaza, United States
 Montecatini Terme, Italy
 Montpellier, France
 Saint Paul, United States
 Saint-Raphaël, France
 Tulsa, United States
 Worms, Germany
 Wuxi, China

Tirat Carmel

 Maurepas, France
 Monheim am Rhein, Germany
 Shamakhi, Azerbaijan
 Veszprém, Hungary

Y
Yokneam Illit

 La Garenne-Colombes, France
 Lugo, Italy

 Požega, Croatia
 San Pedro de Atacama, Chile
 Wiehl, Germany

References

Lists of populated places in Israel
Israel
Populated places in Israel
Foreign relations of Israel
 
Israel geography-related lists